Desmos is a genus of trees and shrubs in the plant family Annonaceae.

The genus consists of 27 species and 5 unresolved species.

Selected species

Desmos acutus (unresolved)
Desmos cambodicus
Desmos caudatus
Desmos chinensis
Desmos chryseus
Desmos cochinchinensis
Desmos costatus
Desmos dinnensis
Desmos dubius
Desmos dumosus
Desmos dunalii
Desmos elegans
Desmos elmeri
Desmos goezeanus
Desmos grandifolius
Desmos hainanensis (unresolved)
Desmos lecardii
Desmos leucanthus
Desmos macrocarpus Bân
Desmos mindorensis (unresolved)
Desmos palawanensis
Desmos pannosus (unresolved)
Desmos pedunculosus (A.DC.) Bân
Desmos polycarpus
Desmos praecox
Desmos ramarowii
Desmos saccopetaloides
Desmos teysmannii (unresolved)
Desmos tiebaghiensis
Desmos viridiflorus
Desmos wardianus
Desmos zeylanicus

References

External links

Plants of the Malay Peninsula - Desmos chinensis Lour.
Butterflycircle - Desmos chinensis, Dwarf Ylang Ylang
Zipcodezoo - Desmos cochinchinensis pictures

Annonaceae
Annonaceae genera